Ron Herbert (1933 – 2 April 2021) was a professional rugby league footballer who played for the Warrington Wolves. 

He made 41 appearances and scored 20 tries. On debut he was the youngest ever player for the Wolves. He came to the attention of the Wolves because of his blistering speed and spent 8 seasons with the club, his appearances were limited by recurrent shoulder injuries.

See also
 List of Warrington Wolves players

References

1933 births
2021 deaths
English rugby league players
Rugby league centres
Warrington Wolves players